Staniel Cay Airport  is an airport serving Staniel Cay, one of the Exuma Islands in The Bahamas.

Facilities

Airport
The airport has three private hangars and one runway. Titan Air, Flamingo Air and Makers Air have offices at the airport.  It serves Staniel Cay and the surrounding Exuma Cays.

Airlines and destinations

References

External links
 
 

Airports in the Bahamas
Exuma